The Kanawha Subdivision is a railroad line owned by CSX Transportation in the U.S. states of West Virginia and Kentucky. It was formerly part of the CSX Huntington East Division. It became part of the CSX Florence Division on June 20, 2016. At its east end it continues west from the New River Subdivision and at its west end it continues west as the Russell Terminal Subdivision of the Louisville Division.

See also
 List of CSX Transportation lines

References

CSX Transportation lines
Transportation in Greenup County, Kentucky
Rail infrastructure in Kentucky
Rail infrastructure in West Virginia